The parallel bars is an artistic gymnastics event held at the Summer Olympics. The event was first held for men at the first modern Olympics in 1896. It was held again in 1904, but not in 1900, 1908, 1912, or 1920 when no apparatus events were awarded medals. The parallel bars was one of the components of the men's artistic individual all-around in 1900, 1908, and 1912, however. The men's parallel bars returned as a medal event in 1924 and has been held every Games since. Parallel bars scores were included in the individual all-around for 1924 and 1928, with no separate apparatus final. In 1932, the parallel bars was entirely separate from the all-around. From 1936 to 1956, there were again no separate apparatus finals with the parallel bars scores used in the all-around. Beginning in 1960, there were separate apparatus finals.

The 1896 Games also featured a team parallel bars event.

Medalists

Men

Multiple medalists

Medalists by country

Gallery

Team parallel bars

At the 1896 Olympics a team version of the parallel bars was held. It was one of two team apparatus events in 1896, along with the team horizontal bar. The team apparatus events were never held again.

The team parallel bar event had 10 sets of parallel bars for the team to use. Teams could be large, with one exceeding 30 members. Three teams competed, one from Germany and two from Greece. Judges scored the teams on execution, rhythm, and technical difficulty.

References

Parallel bars
Parallel bars at the Olympics